The Maxwell stress tensor (named after James Clerk Maxwell) is a symmetric second-order tensor used in classical electromagnetism to represent the interaction between electromagnetic forces and mechanical momentum. In simple situations, such as a point charge moving freely in a homogeneous magnetic field, it is easy to calculate the forces on the charge from the Lorentz force law. When the situation becomes more complicated, this ordinary procedure can become impractically difficult, with equations spanning multiple lines. It is therefore convenient to collect many of these terms in the Maxwell stress tensor, and to use tensor arithmetic to find the answer to the problem at hand.

In the relativistic formulation of electromagnetism, the Maxwell's tensor appears as a part of the electromagnetic stress–energy tensor which is the electromagnetic component of the total stress–energy tensor. The latter describes the density and flux of energy and momentum in spacetime.

Motivation

For the case of nonlinear materials (such as magnetic iron with a BH-curve), the nonlinear Maxwell stress tensor must be used.

Equation
In physics, the Maxwell stress tensor is the stress tensor of an electromagnetic field. As derived above in SI units, it is given by:
,

In Gaussian cgs unit, it is given by:
,

where  is the magnetizing field.

An alternative way of expressing this tensor is:

where  is the dyadic product, and the last tensor is the unit dyad:

The element  of the Maxwell stress tensor has units of momentum per unit of area per unit time and gives the flux of momentum parallel to the th axis crossing a surface normal to the th axis (in the negative direction) per unit of time.

These units can also be seen as units of force per unit of area (negative pressure), and the  element of the tensor can also be interpreted as the force parallel to the th axis suffered by a surface normal to the th axis per unit of area. Indeed, the diagonal elements give the tension (pulling) acting on a differential area element normal to the corresponding axis. Unlike forces due to the pressure of an ideal gas, an area element in the electromagnetic field also feels a force in a direction that is not normal to the element. This shear is given by the off-diagonal elements of the stress tensor.

The Maxwell stress tensor is a complex number whose real part is the Poynting momentum flux density.

In magnetostatics
If the field is only magnetic (which is largely true in motors, for instance), some of the terms drop out, and the equation in SI units becomes:

For cylindrical objects, such as the rotor of a motor, this is further simplified to:

In electrostatics

In electrostatics the effects of magnetism are not present. In this case the magnetic field vanishes, i.e. , and we obtain the electrostatic Maxwell stress tensor. It is given in component form by

 

and in symbolic form by

 

where  is the appropriate identity tensor usually .

Eigenvalue
The eigenvalues of the Maxwell stress tensor are given by:

These eigenvalues are obtained by iteratively applying the Matrix Determinant Lemma, in conjunction with the Sherman–Morrison formula.

Noting that the characteristic equation matrix, can be written as

 

where

 

we set

 

Applying the Matrix Determinant Lemma once, this gives us

 

Applying it again yields,

 

From the last multiplicand on the RHS, we immediately see that  is one of the eigenvalues.

 

Factoring out a  term in the determinant, we are left with finding the zeros of the rational function:

 

Thus, once we solve

 

we obtain the other two eigenvalues.

See also
 Ricci calculus
 Energy density of electric and magnetic fields
 Poynting vector
 Electromagnetic stress–energy tensor
 Magnetic pressure
 Magnetic tension force

References

 David J. Griffiths, "Introduction to Electrodynamics" pp. 351–352, Benjamin Cummings Inc., 2008
 John David Jackson, "Classical Electrodynamics, 3rd Ed.", John Wiley & Sons, Inc., 1999.
 Richard Becker, "Electromagnetic Fields and Interactions", Dover Publications Inc., 1964.

Tensor physical quantities
Electromagnetism
James Clerk Maxwell